Taylor Hill may refer to:

Places
 Taylor Hill, Huddersfield, West Yorkshire, England, UK; a suburb of the English town of Huddersfield
 Taylor Hill (Delaware County, New York), USA; a mountain

People
 Taylor Hill (baseball) (born 1989), American baseball player
 Taylor Hill (model) (born 1996), American model
 Taylor Hill (sprinter) (born 1996), sprinter from the British Virgin Islands

See also
 Taylors Hill, Auckland, North Island, New Zealand; a volcano
 Taylor Hills, Carter County, Montana, USA; a set of hills
 Taylor (disambiguation)

Hill, Taylor